J62 may refer to:
 , a minesweeper of the Royal Navy
 LNER Class J62, a British steam locomotive clas
 Metabidiminished icosahedron